Aquarius is a genus of water striders found predominantly in the northern hemisphere. Formerly a subgenus, Aquarius was elevated to generic rank in 1990 on the basis of phylogenetic analysis.

Species
There are 17 species in the genus Aquarius:
Aquarius adelaidis (Dohrn, 1860)
Aquarius amplus (Drake & Harris, 1938)
Aquarius antigone (Kirkaldy, 1899)
Aquarius chilensis (Berg, 1881)
Aquarius cinereus (Puton, 1869) 
Aquarius conformis (Uhler, 1878)
Aquarius distanti (Horváth, 1899) 
Aquarius elongatus (Uhler, 1896)
Aquarius fabricii Andersen, 1990
Aquarius lili D.A. Polhemus & J.T. Polhemus, 1994
Aquarius najas (De Geer, 1773) 
Aquarius nebularis (Drake & Hottes, 1925)
Aquarius paludum (Fabricius, 1794) 
Aquarius philippinensis Zettel & Ruiz, 2003
Aquarius remigis (Say, 1832) 
Aquarius remigoides Gallant & Fairbairn, 1996
Aquarius ventralis (Fieber, 1861)

References

Gerrini
Gerromorpha genera